Wilton Pereira Sampaio (born 28 December 1981) is a Brazilian football referee. He has been on FIFA's list of international referees since 2013. His younger brother Sávio Pereira Sampaio is also a referee and on FIFA's list since 2022.

Professional 
Pereira Sampaio began refereeing at age 15, qualified in Brasilia in 2000 and currently represents the Federação Goiana de Futebol and FIFA. He was elected as one of the best referees in the 2012 Campeonato Brasileiro Série A championships.

Sampaio was considered too short by Brazilian referee head, Armando Marques, but after Marques left in 2005, Sampaio was given more high profile games.

Sampaio was part of the video assistant referee (VAR) team when it was introduced in the 2018 FIFA World Cup. He also refereed in both the 2021 FIFA Arab Cup and 2022 FIFA World Cup in Qatar.

References

1981 births
Brazilian football referees
Living people
Sportspeople from Goiás
Copa América referees
2022 FIFA World Cup referees